Wayne Lewis (born 1951/1952) is an Australian Paralympic lawn bowler. He became a paraplegic while working on a farm with his father. He was sitting underneath a slasher and changing the blades; the hydraulics broke and the slasher collapsed on him. His father pulled him out, and played a major role in his rehabilitation, encouraging him back into driving tractors on the farm.

After the accident, Lewis taught himself to ski and play lawn bowls. He won a silver medal in the men's lawn bowls pairs with Ken Moran  at the 1984 New York/Stoke Mandeville Paralympics.

Lewis and his wife Carol run a  sheep and cattle property and a bed and breakfast lodge called Ruth's House near Tatong in Victoria. He is a Life Member of the Tatong Football Netball Club.

References

External links
 

1950s births
Living people
Australian male bowls players
Paralympic lawn bowls players of Australia
Paralympic silver medalists for Australia
Paralympic medalists in lawn bowls
Wheelchair category Paralympic competitors
Lawn bowls players at the 1984 Summer Paralympics
Medalists at the 1984 Summer Paralympics
People with paraplegia
Sportsmen from Victoria (Australia)
20th-century Australian people